The Overland Route was a train route operated jointly by the Union Pacific Railroad and the Central Pacific Railroad / Southern Pacific Railroad, between Council Bluffs, Iowa / Omaha, Nebraska, and the San Francisco Bay Area, over the grade of the first transcontinental railroad (aka the "Pacific Railroad") which had been opened on May 10, 1869.  Passenger trains that operated over the line included the Overland Flyer, later renamed the Overland Limited, which also included a connection to Chicago. Although these passenger rail trains are no longer in operation, the Overland Route remains a common name for the line from Northern California to Chicago, now owned entirely by the Union Pacific.  Although now primarily used for freight, a few portions still provide the route for the California Zephyr passenger train.

History 

The name harkens back to the Central Overland Route,  a stagecoach line operated by the Overland Mail Company between Salt Lake City, Utah, and Virginia City, Nevada, from 1861 to 1866, when Wells Fargo & Company took over the stagecoach's operation. Wells Fargo ended this stagecoach service three years later.

While the Council Bluffs/Omaha to San Francisco "Pacific Railroad" grade was opened in 1869, the name “Overland” was not formally adopted for any daily extra-fare train over the route until almost two decades later. On November 13, 1887, the Union Pacific inaugurated service of its Overland Flyer between Omaha and Ogden, Utah, where passengers and through cars were transferred to the Southern Pacific, which had acquired the CPRR's operations on that line in 1885 under a 99-year lease. The UP changed its designation to the Overland Limited on November 17, 1895, and service continued as a daily train under that name in one form or another for almost seven decades. For the first dozen years that the SP met the UP's Overland trains, however, it dubbed its service the "Ogden Gateway Route"; its connecting westbound trains operated as the Pacific Express and eastbound trains as the Atlantic Express. The SP finally adopted the name the Overland Limited in 1899 for its portion of the run as well.

The original  of the route from Omaha to San Francisco traversed some of the most desolate (as well some of the most picturesque) lands of the western two-thirds of the North American continent. While the trip originally took low-fare emigrant trains a full week (or more) to complete, by 1906 the electric lighted all-Pullman Overland Limited covered the route in just 56 hours.

E. H. Harriman bought the bankrupt Union Pacific in 1897; in 1901, he assumed control of the Central Pacific and Southern Pacific as well. The rebuilding of the Overland Route followed: hundreds of miles of double track, hundreds of miles of signals, and dozens of realignments to reduce grades, curvature, and perhaps distance. (The rebuilding actually started before the CP/SP acquisition—the map in the May 1969 issue of Trains shows the Howell-to-Bossler stretch realigned in 1899.)

By 1926, the UP route from Council Bluffs/Omaha to Ogden was continuous double track, except for the Aspen Tunnel (east of Evanston, Wyoming), which remained a bottleneck until 1949. The CP/SP portion of the route was also largely double-tracked during this period, with the completion of such projects as the 1909 Hood Realignment between Rocklin and Newcastle, double-tunneling along the Sierra Grade including at Cisco and the summit (Tunnel #41), and the 1924 agreement to share tracks across Nevada with the Western Pacific Railroad's Feather River Route.

Among the most important improvements to the original grade was the Lucin Cutoff, a new  stretch from just west of Ogden to Lucin, a few miles east of the Nevada border. It included a 12-mile (19 km) trestle on wooden pilings across the Great Salt Lake.

But many other sections of the original 1860s grade were harder to improve on, notably over the Sierra Nevada between Colfax, California, and Reno, Nevada. The newer second track follows a better route here and there, but the original route changed little (except for the removal of the wooden snowsheds, or their replacement by nonflammable concrete ones) until the 1993 abandonment of the 6.7-mile section of the Track No. 1 crossing of the summit between Norden and Eder which includes the original  Summit Tunnel (No. 6). Traffic was sent instead over the easier-to-maintain Track No. 2 and through the  tunnel called “The Big Hole” (No. 41) which had been driven under Mt. Judah a mile south of the Pass when that portion of the line was double tracked in 1925. Aside from those modifications, the Sierra grade looks much the same to train passengers as it did when the line opened in 1868.

Connection to Chicago 
From the start-up of the Overland Flyer in 1887 the Chicago and North Western Railway handled Overland Route trains between Chicago and Omaha. On October 30, 1955, passenger operations east of Omaha shifted to the Chicago, Milwaukee, St. Paul and Pacific Railroad (the "Milwaukee Road").

Demise 

As intercity passenger rail travel began to decline after World War II and into the 1950s with the growth of the airline industry and development of the Interstate Highway System, the Overland route gradually lost its luster and service declined. After almost seven decades of continuous operation, the Overland Limited came to an end as a daily train on July 16, 1962, when the Interstate Commerce Commission approved termination of the service. While the train continued to run until Labor Day (with some additional holiday runs from Christmas to the New Year), the name “Overland” did not appear in the schedules of the UP or SP again after its last run on January 2, 1963. The only daily passenger train between Omaha and the San Francisco Bay area today is the California Zephyr, operated by Amtrak and mostly along a different, more scenic route. The Zephyr only uses the Overland Route in the states of California and Nevada, passing through Salt Lake City instead of Ogden and traveling via the Central Corridor to Denver instead of Cheyenne. In 1996, the Union Pacific again acquired the Southern Pacific, resulting in the entire Chicago-Oakland line being owned by a single company.

Route description

Council Bluffs/Omaha to Ogden (via the Union Pacific) 

Heading west from Council Bluffs/Omaha over the same wide-open plains of Nebraska's Platte River Valley that had been followed by so many wagon trains from the 1840s through the 1860s, Overland trains passed first through Fremont, Grand Island, and Kearney (196 miles from Omaha) where all the wagon trails from the Missouri River communities between Omaha and Kansas City had once converged. There the famous Fort Kearney had been built by the U.S. Army in 1858 to protect the Oregon–California Trail heading west, and from which, under the direction of Union Generals U.S. Grant and W.T. Sherman, soldiers had been dispatched to protect UP surveyors and construction crews from Indian attack as the road progressed across Nebraska towards Wyoming.

The Rocky Mountains first came into passengers’ view  further on at Hillsdale with the appearance of the dark crests of the Laramie Range.

At Green River passengers were treated to views of two of the most spectacular rock formations in Wyoming—Man's Face directly southwest of the station, and Castle Rock just north of it. Six miles after crossing the Bear River at Evanston the route entered Utah, a land which would provide passengers with close-up views of some of the most unusual rock formations of the entire trip.

After passing Henefer where Brigham Young and his Mormon pioneers had turned southward in 1847 to cross the Wasatch Mountains into Emigration Cañon, perhaps the two most famous features on the Union Pacific's section of the Overland, Thousand Mile Tree and Devil's Slide, came into view on the west, and south sides of the track, respectively. Here the Union Pacific lines diverged to Los Angeles and the Pacific Northwest while the Southern Pacific (which acquired operational control of the CPRR's original Pacific route under lease in 1885) took charge of the “Overland Limited” and other trains on to San Francisco.

Ogden to San Francisco (via the Central Pacific/Southern Pacific) 

When the route opened in 1869, trains reached the San Francisco Bay. 
For the 35 years after the driving of the “Last Spike” at Promontory Summit in 1869, all trains traveling west of Ogden passed over the site of that seminal event as they made their way around the northern end of the Great Salt Lake. In November 1903, the SP opened the Lucin Cutoff, a  stretch of track featuring a  trestle built on pilings across the Great Salt Lake. Ten miles past Lucin, the “Overland” crossed into Nevada at Tecoma, the nearest railroad town to the silver, copper, and lead deposits discovered in the region in 1874.

Devil's Peak, a perpendicular rock rising  from the edge of the Humboldt River, dominated the canyon scenery at Palisade while the last major stop in Nevada was Reno with the Sierra Nevada mountains dominating the view ahead.

The next hundred miles of grade from Reno to Colfax, California, were by far the most challenging to build and provided the most impressive views of the whole route, although for much of that stretch passengers could see nothing as trains traveled through miles of tunnels and snowsheds. After passing Verdi, Nevada—which in November 1870 had become the site of the first train robbery on the Pacific coast—the Overland Route crossed into California and followed the Truckee River up a picturesque canyon to the town of Truckee on Donner Lake where the ill-fated George Donner party had been snowbound in the winter of 1846–7.

The miles of showsheds needed to keep the line passable left the impression among passengers that they were “railroading in a tunnel” for much of the route. The wooden snowsheds sometimes caught fire from lightning strikes or embers from steam locomotives.

This spot was so popular that for many years the Southern Pacific stopped the Overland and most other trains for a few minutes so that passengers could get off the train and take it all in from a special observation area.

When the route opened in 1869, trains reached the San Francisco Bay area from Sacramento via a  line (built by the original Western Pacific Railroad) by way of Stockton over Altamont Pass, and on through Niles Cañon first to a pier at Alameda, and shortly thereafter to the nearby two-mile long Oakland Long Wharf (later called the "SP Mole") from which San Francisco was then accessed by ferry. After half a century of operation, the train ferry was replaced in October 1930 by a massive drawbridge built by the SP between Benicia and Martinez. It is still in use today.

Subdivisions

The modern incarnation of the Union Pacific Railroad has divided the Overland Route into the following subdivisions
Geneva Subdivision Chicago, Illinois, to Clinton, Iowa
Clinton Subdivision Clinton to Boone
Boone Subdivision Boone to Missouri Valley, Iowa
Blair Subdivision Missouri Valley to Fremont, Nebraska (this subdivision bypasses Omaha, Nebraska)
Omaha Subdivision Missouri Valley to Fremont (via Omaha)
Columbus Subdivision Fremont to Grand Island
Kearney Subdivision Grand Island to North Platte
Sidney Subdivision North Platte to Cheyenne, Wyoming
Laramie Subdivision Cheyenne to Rawlins
Rawlins Subdivision Rawlins to Green River
Evanston Subdivision Green River to Ogden, Utah
Lakeside Subdivision Ogden to Alazon (line switchover near Wells, Nevada)
Shafter Subdivision - Alazon to Elko 
Elko Subdivision - Elko to Weso (line switch near Winnemucca)
Nevada Subdivision - Weso to Sparks
Roseville Subdivision - Sparks to Roseville, California
Martinez Subdivision - Roseville to Oakland, California

See also 

 Overland Limited–  a similarly named passenger train, operated by the Atchison, Topeka and Santa Fe Railway
 First transcontinental railroad– covers the construction of this rail line

Notes

References

External links 
 Maps of the Overland Route, 1915

Union Pacific Railroad lines
Passenger trains of the Union Pacific Railroad
Passenger trains of the Southern Pacific Transportation Company
Passenger trains of the Chicago and North Western Railway
Passenger trains of the Milwaukee Road
Named passenger trains of the United States
Rail infrastructure in California
Rail infrastructure in Nevada
Rail infrastructure in Utah
Railway services introduced in 1887
Railway services discontinued in 1962